Chants et contes de Noël (meaning Christmas Songs and Tales) is the fifth French-language studio album by Canadian singer Celine Dion, released in Quebec, Canada on 3 December 1983. It is also her second Christmas album.

Content
Chants et contes de Noël includes three songs ("Promenade en traîneau", "Joyeux Noël" and "Glory Alleluia") from Dion's first Christmas release Céline Dion chante Noël (1981). The album was promoted by "Un enfant", originally by Jacques Brel. "Un enfant" is also featured in Dion's 1984 compilation, Les plus grands succès de Céline Dion.

The album includes also "À quatre pas d'ici", an adaptation of Bucks Fizz's UK number-one hit "The Land of Make Believe" and a B-side of "Un enfant" single. Authors of that song wrote for Dion hits like "Think Twice" and "Call the Man" many years later.

Commercial performance
The album reached number seventeen in Quebec.

Track listing

Charts

Release history

References

External links
 

1983 Christmas albums
Albums produced by Eddy Marnay
Celine Dion albums
Christmas albums by Canadian artists
Pop Christmas albums
Albums produced by René Angélil